Kurr (Icelandic for "Coo") is the debut album by the Icelandic quartet amiina. It was released on March 21, 2007 by their own label, Bláskjár Records, after being preceded by the single "Seoul" in late 2006. The album was partly recorded in Sigur Rós' Sundlaugin studio. Initial distribution of Kurr is being handled through the official Amiina website.

Track listing

All tracks written and performed by Amiina.

Personnel

 Orri Páll Dýrason – drums
 Freyja Gunnlaugsdóttir – bass clarinet on "Lóri"
 Eiríkur Orri Ólafsson, Snorri Sigurðarson – trumpet on "Bláfeldur"
 Helgi Hrafn Jónsson, Ingi Garðar Erlandsson, Samúel J. Samúelsson – trombone on "Bláfeldur"

References

Amiina albums
2007 albums